Agrococcus pavilionensis is a bacterium from the genus Agrococcus.

References

Microbacteriaceae
Bacteria described in 2018